Savin-Wilson House, also known as the Dew Duck Inn Hunting Club and John B. Savin House, is a historic home located near Smyrna, Kent County, Delaware.  It built about 1820, and consists of a two-story, five-bay, gable-roofed brick main block with a one-story, gable-roofed frame kitchen wing.  It is in a late Georgian / Federal vernacular style.

It was listed on the National Register of Historic Places in 1992.

References

Houses on the National Register of Historic Places in Delaware
Georgian architecture in Delaware
Federal architecture in Delaware
Houses completed in 1820
Houses in Kent County, Delaware
National Register of Historic Places in Kent County, Delaware